USS Nautilus was a 76-foot schooner launched in 1838 for hydrographic surveying of the coast of the United States. She was commissioned into the United States Navy in 1847 for service in the Mexican–American War.

Service history

Coast and Geodetic Survey 
The second Nautilus, the first ship designed for the Coast and Geodetic Survey, was completed in 1838. Until the spring of 1844 she carried out surveys for the Commerce Department in the Gulf of Mexico and along the Atlantic Coast, operating under Mr. F. R. Hossler (1838–1843) and Dr. A. D. Bache (1843–1844). In April 1844, although still a Coast and Geodetic Survey ship, she was put under the command of Lt. G. M. Bache, USN, to undertake surveys for the Navy.

Mexican–American War
Three years later, in 1847, she was taken over by the Navy for temporary duties during the Mexican–American War, as light draft vessels were needed for operations off the Gulf coast. Such vessels, with their ability to ride over the sandbars frequently found at the entrances to harbors on that coast, and to patrol between those harbors close to shore, facilitated combined operations and the Navy's important duty of providing General Taylor with a secure line of communications in the Gulf.

Nautilus was returned to the Coast and Geodetic Survey in July 1848 and performed survey duties for that agency until 1859.

References
 

Schooners of the United States Navy
1838 ships